The Vogtendorf Formation, in 2001 redefined from the older name Randschiefer-Serie by Sdzuy et al., is a geologic formation in Bavaria, Germany. It preserves fossils dating back to the Tremadocian stage of the Ordovician period.

Fossil content 
Trilobites

 Agerina alkleini
 Echinosphaerites henkleini
 Macrocystella greilingi
 Parapilekia vogtendorfensis
 Poramborthis vonhorstigi
 Ranorthis franconica

Rhynchonellata
 Orthida
 Giraldiellidae
 Kvania mergli

See also 
 List of fossiliferous stratigraphic units in Germany
 Folkeslunda Limestone

References

Bibliography 
 
 

Geologic formations of Germany
Ordovician System of Europe
Ordovician Germany
Tremadocian
Tuff formations
Shallow marine deposits
Ordovician southern paleotemperate deposits
Paleontology in Germany